Loureiro is a white wine grape cultivated in the northwest of the Iberian Peninsula. This includes Galicia,  Spain and Minho,  Portugal. In the latter, it is notably cultivated along the Lima River, a sub-region of Vinho Verde (wines produced in Minho).

Synonyms 
Loureiro is also known under the synonyms Branco Redondo, Branco Redondos, Dorado, Dourada, Dourado, False Pedro, Gallego Dourado, Loeireiro Blanco, Loureiro, Loureiro Blanco, Marques, Marquez, and Rutherglen Pedro.

See also
List of Portuguese grape varieties

References

Spanish wine
Grape varieties of Spain
White wine grape varieties
Galicia (Spain)